The Lucas Troendle House is a historic house in Mapleton, Minnesota, United States.  The house, also known as Solie's Castle, was built in 1896 in Queen Anne style.  Lucas Troendle (b. 1830) was an early merchant and landowner in Mapleton who became a leading figure in the community.  It became the Holt Hotel after Troendle died in 1917.

The house was listed on the National Register of Historic Places in 1980 for its local significance in the themes of architecture and commerce.  It was nominated for exemplifying the prosperity attained by many who invested in land and commercial enterprises in the region's rail towns of the late 19th century.

The three-story brick home, with eight bedrooms and more than 5,000 square feet of living space, was sold at auction in August 2022.

See also
 National Register of Historic Places listings in Blue Earth County, Minnesota

References

1896 establishments in Minnesota
Houses completed in 1896
Houses in Blue Earth County, Minnesota
Houses on the National Register of Historic Places in Minnesota
National Register of Historic Places in Blue Earth County, Minnesota
Queen Anne architecture in Minnesota